Ursino is an Italian surname. Notable people with the surname include:

Luigi Ursino (born 1933), Italian mobster
Luciano Ursino (born 1988), Argentina footballer
Gennaro Ursino (1650–1715), Italian composer and teacher

Italian-language surnames